Jiushe is a metro station operated by Taichung Metro located in Beitun District, Taichung, Taiwan. It is on the Green Line and is the western terminus of the planned Dakeng Extension.

The station name is taken from an old name of the area.

Station layout

Around the station
 Zongzhan Night Market
 Nanxing Park
 Han River (Taiwan)
 Wagor High School
 Dakeng

Exits 
Single Exit: Intersection of Songzhu Road and Dunfu Road

References 

Taichung Metro
Railway stations in Taichung
Railway stations opened in 2020